Alexander Keith (13 November 1792 – 8 February 1880) was a Church of Scotland and Free Church minister, known for his writings on biblical prophecy. Keith interpreted the bible as teaching a premillenial view of Jesus' return and many of his books relate to the place of the Jews and how they relate to Jewish and Christian prophecies in the Bible. Keith, along with Robert Murray M'Cheyne, Andrew Bonar, and Alexander Black visited Palestine on a missionary trip. Taking a faster route home than their other companions Black and Keith passed through Budapest. Keith contracted cholera and nearly died but was influential in setting up a mission to the Jews in Hungary. At the Disruption, Keith sided with the Free Church and continued to minister to a congregation at St Cyrus and to publish works on biblical prophecy.

Life
He was the son of George Skene Keith of Keith Hall and Kinkell, where he was born at the manse on 13 November 1792. He graduated M.A. at Marischal College, in 1809.  He was ordained by the Church of Scotland as minister of St. Cyrus in 1816, remaining there until 1839.

At the Disruption of 1843, Keith left the established Church of Scotland and joined the Free Church of Scotland.

William Garden Blaikie, the nephew of Keith wrote this about his uncle:

Keith is probably best remembered for his book, Evidence of the Truth of the Christian Religion Derived from the Literal Fulfillment of Prophecy, which has gone through numerous revisions and many editions.  It is still in print in a 2005 edition from Kessinger Publishing.

In the General Assembly of the Free Church, Keith is recorded as speaking out against the National Covenant:

Palestine and Eastern Europe

Palestine

Keith is also remembered as one of four Church of Scotland ministers who in 1839 undertook a Mission of Inquiry to Palestine. The others were Andrew Bonar, Robert Murray M'Cheyne and Alexander Black. The group travelled through France, Greece, and Egypt then overland to Gaza.  The route home led through Syria, the Austrian Empire and some of the German States.  The group sought Jewish communities along the route to inquire about the readiness of these communities to accept Christ and, separately, their preparedness to return to Israel as prophesied in the Bible.  Keith recounts the journey in his 1843 book The Land of Israel According to the Covenant with Abraham, with Isaac, and with Jacob. It was also in that book that Keith used the slogan that became popular with other Christian Restorationists, A land without a people for a people without a land.

Budapest
William Garden Blaikie, the nephew of Keith wrote this about his uncle:

Return to Palestine
In 1844, accompanied by his son, Dr. George Skene Keith (1819–1910), he revisited Palestine, and was the first to take daguerrotype views of notable places there. They remained in Syria for five months, and travelled in different directions above a thousand miles, and  along the coast from Gaza to Suedia, at the mouth of the Orontes. They visited Jerusalem, Hebron, Petra, Samaria, Gerash, Nazareth, Tiberias, Chorazin (the first time it had been visited by British travellers); discovered Zimrin, the ancient capital of the Zemaritis; visited Damascus, Laodicea (Latakia), Antioch, and many other important places. Dr. George Keith was  the first to take daguerreotype views of scenes in Syria, from which the illustrations are given in prophecies relating to the restoration of the Jews to edition of the Evidences.

Two of Alexander Keith's sons were surgeons who set up a private hospital in Edinburgh and were members of the Photographic Society of Scotland.

Keith is one of a large number of Christians who campaigned for a restoration of the Jews to their ancient homeland.   In 1843 he wrote: "Greece was given to the Greeks, and in seeking any government for Syria, may not a confederacy of kings ... give Judea to the Jews?"

Death and legacy

The moderatorship of the Free Church of Scotland was repeatedly offered to Keith, but he declined it on account of his infirm health. He died at Aberdeen House, 56 West Street, Buxton, where he had resided for some years, on 8 February 1880, and was buried at Chinley, Chapel-en-le-Frith, Derbyshire, on 12 February.

Keith's first book on "The Fulfilment of Prophecy " appeared in 1823. It soon took its place as a standard treatise on the "Christian Evidences," and has passed through a vast number of editions. There are many languages into which the book has been translated. At subsequent periods Dr. Keith published various works on prophetical subjects, the most popular of which were "The Signs of the Times, illustrated by the Fulfilment of Historical Predictions," and "The Harmony of Prophecy," being a comparison of the Book of Revelation with other prophecies of Scripture. But none of his works reached the popularity of the "Evidences," of which Thomas Chalmers said that "it is recognised in our halls of theology as holding a high place in sacred literature, and it is found in almost every home, and known as a household word throughout the land."

Family
He  married  10  December 1816,  Jane  (died  2nd  February  1837),  daughter of  John  Blackie,  plumber,  Aberdeen, (and sister of James Blaikie and Thomas Blaikie and had  issue—
Alexander,  his  assistant  and successor
George Skene Keith,  M.D.  (Edinburgh 1841),  LL.D.  (Aberdeen  1895),  author  of Plea  for  a  Simpler  Life,  Plea  for  a  Simpler Faith,  Fads  of  an  Old  Physician,  etc.,  born 11  March  1819,  died  12  January  1910
John,  in  Mercantile  Marine,  born  5 January  1821
James,  M.D.  (Edinburgh 1845),  born  22  January  1823
Patrick,  born 29  January  1825
Thomas Keith,  M.D.  (Edinburgh 1848),  LL.D.  (Aberdeen  1894),  an  eminent surgeon  and  author,  born  27  May  1827, died  in  London  9  October  1895 
David, M.D.  (Edinburgh  1851),  assistant  surgeon, H.E I.C.S.,  born  9  March  1829
Helen, born  18th  Sept.  1831.

Works

Sermons, articles and letters
Letter  to  the  Right Hon.  Lord  Bexley  on  the  Collision  between the  Civil  and  the  Church  Courts  in  Scotland (London,  1841)
A  Sermon  Preached  at  St Cyrus  (with  another  by  Dr Davidson) (Aberdeen,  1841)
Origin of the Mission to the Jews at Pesth (1867)

Books
See lists
 Sketch of the Evidence from Prophecy; containing an account of those prophecies which were distinctly foretold, and which have been clearly or literally fulfilled. With an appendix, extracted from Sir Isaac Newton's Observations on the Prophecies, Edinburgh, 1823.
 Evidence of the Truth of the Christian Religion derived from the Literal Fulfilment of Prophecy; particularly as illustrated by the History of the Jews, and by the Discoveries of Recent Travellers,  Edinburgh: Waugh & Innes, 1826 (2nd ed.) and many later editions.  American edition - Philadelphia: Presbyterian Board of Publication, circa 1850 (395 pp).(Edinburgh,  1828,  translated  into  Persian, Edinburgh,  1836) (See also Allibone's notes)
 Signs of the Times, as Denoted by the Fulfilment of Historical Predictions, Traced Down from the Babylonish Captivity to the Present Time, Edinburgh: William Whyte & Co. 1832.  (383 pp). 2  vols. Republished 1837, 1842, 1847.....
Demonstration of  the  Truth  of  the  Christian  Religion (Edinburgh,  1838)
 The Land of Israel According to the Covenant with Abraham, With Isaac, and With Jacob, Edinburgh: William Whyte & Co. 1844.(Edinburgh,  1843)
An Examination  of  Mr  Elliott's  Theory  of the  First  Six  Seals  (Edinburgh,  1847)
 Isaiah as it is: or, Judah and Jerusalem the subjects of Isaiah's Prophesying, Edinburgh, 1850.
 The Harmony of Prophecy; or Scriptural Illustrations of the Apocalypse, Edinburgh, 1851.
 Coming Events, or, Glimpses of the future; being an explanation of the prophecies relating to the destruction of Turkey and Egypt, the downfall of Rome, the war of Armageddon, and the invasion by Russia, etc., Dublin, 1853
Scripture  versus  Stanley  (London,  1859)
 The History and Destiny of the World and of the Church according to Scripture, London, 1861.

Images
 http://www.edinphoto.org.uk/3/3_pss_members_keith_father_alexander.htm

See also
 Restoration of the Jews to the Holy Land
 Christian Zionism
 Church of Scotland
 A land without a people for a people without a land
 Disruption of 1843

References

Citations

Sources

External links
 

1792 births
1880 deaths
19th-century Ministers of the Church of Scotland
19th-century Ministers of the Free Church of Scotland
19th-century Scottish writers
Alumni of the University of Aberdeen
British Christian Zionists
Premillennialism
Presbyterian missionaries in Palestine (region)
Presbyterian writers
Scottish Calvinist and Reformed theologians
Scottish Presbyterian missionaries